The 1959 World Archery Championships was the 20th edition of the event. It was held in Stockholm, Sweden on 6–9 August 1959 and was organised by World Archery Federation (FITA).

It marked the first win in a run of 13 successive championship wins for the United States men's team.

Medals summary

Recurve

Medals table

References

External links
 World Archery website
 Complete results

World Championship
World Archery
World Archery Championships
International archery competitions hosted by Sweden
1950s in Stockholm
International sports competitions in Stockholm